The following is a timeline of the history of Havana, Cuba.

Prior to 18th century

 1514 – Diego Velázquez de Cuéllar founds settlement.
 1519 - Current location of the city 
 1537 – Town sacked.
 1555 – Town sacked by Jacques de Sores.
 1577 – Castillo de la Real Fuerza built.
 1578 – Church of Santo Domingo built.
 1589 – Governor's residence relocated to Havana from Santiago de Cuba.
 1591 – Basilica Menor de San Francisco de Asis built.
 1592 – City status granted.
 1607 – Havana becomes capital of Cuba.
 1608 – San Agustin church built.
 1630 – San Salvador de la Punta Fortress built.
 1640 – Morro Castle built.
 1644 – Convent of Santa Clara founded.
 1648 – Epidemic.
 1668 –  construction begins.
 1688 – Recollect Dominicans of Santa Cataline de Siena founded.
 1693 – San Felipe church built.
 1700
 Discalced Carmelites of Santa Teresa de Jesus founded.
 Santa Catalina church built.

18th century
 1702 – City walls built.
 1704 – Jesuit college built.
 1728 – Royal and Pontifical University of Saint Jerome established (University of Havana).
 

 1748 – Battle of Havana.
 1762 – Battle of Havana; British in power.
 1763 – 6 July: Spanish in power per Treaty of Paris (1763).
 1767 – Castillo de Atarés built.
 1768
 Hurricane.
 New city districts established: Campeche (including barrios San Francisco, San Isidro, Santa Paula, Santa Teresa) and La Punte (including barrios El Angel, Dragones, La Estrella, Monserrate).
 1772 – Paseo del Prado laid out (approximate date).
 1774 – La Cabaña fortress built.
 1775 – El Coleseo (theatre) built on the Alameda de Paula.
 1777 – Cathedral of Havana built.
 1780 – Castle del Príncipe built.
 1781 – 
Hospital de San Lazaro, Havana
 1787 – Roman Catholic diocese of San Cristóbal de la Habana established.
 1789 – Bishopric established.
 1791 – Population: 51,307.
 1792
 Sociedad Económica de los Amigos del País de la Habana established.
 Palace built.
 1794
 Consulado (merchant guild) established.
 La Casa de Beneficencia y Maternidad de La Habana
1799
 Bateria de Santa Clara, 1799 :File:Battery of Santa Clara areal. Havana, Cuba.jpg

19th century

 1806 - Espada Cemetery|
 1810 – Hurricane.
 1811 – Population: 94,023.
 1813 – El Lucero de la Habana newspaper begins publication.
 1817
 Botanical Gardens established.
 La Piña de Plata eatery in business.
 1828 – El Templete built in the Plaza de Armas.
 1832 – El Noticioso y Lucero de la Habana newspaper begins publication.
 1834 – President's Palace built.
 1835
 Fernando VII aqueduct constructed.
 Mercado de Cristina (market) built on Plaza Vieja.
 1837 – Railway (Havana-Bejucal), Mercado de Cristina, and city jail constructed.
 1838 – Teatro Tacón opens.
 1840 – Plaza del Vapor
 1841 - Population: 184,508.
 1844
 Liceo Artistico y Literario de la Habana (lyceum) founded.
 Palacio de Aldama built.
 1846 – Great Havana Hurricane.
 1847 – Premiere of Bottesini's opera Cristoforo Colombo.
 1853
 Susini cigarette factory in operation.
 Revista de la Habana literary magazine begins publication.
 1854 – Colegio de Belén founded.
 Plaza del Vapor, Havana
 1856 – Hotel Inglaterra built.
 1861 – Royal Academy of Medical, Physical, and Natural Sciences established.
 1863
 Fuente de la India (fountain) installed in Parque Central.
 City walls dismantled.
 1868
 El Ansador Comercial begins publication.
 Colon Cemetery inaugurated.
 1871 – 27 November: Students executed.(es)
 1876 – Hotel Pasaje built.
 1877
 Villalba palace built.
 Payret Theatre opens.
 1878
 Acueducto de Albear inaugurated.
 City becomes part of La Habana Province.
 1880 – Colegio de Abogados de La Habana (bar association) founded.
 1881 – Jane Theater-Circus built.
 1882 – School of arts and trades opens.
 1884 – La Lucha newspaper begins publication.
 1888 – La Discusion newspaper begins publication.
 1889 – Population: 200,000.
 1890 – Alhambra Theatre opens.
 1894 – Manzana de Gómez built.
 1898 – 15 February: United States Navy Ship Maine explosion.
 1899 
 U.S. military occupation begins.
 Population: 235,981.

20th century

1900s–1940s
 1901
 Biblioteca Nacional José Martí (library) established.
 Malecón (esplanade) construction begins.
 1902
 20 May: U.S. occupation of Cuba ends. Republic of Cuba promulgated.
 El Mundo and Tierra newspapers begin publication.
 1905 – Petroleum refinery in operation.
 1907
 Palace of the Association of Store Clerks built.
 Population: 297,159.
 Sociedad de Ingenieros y Arquitectos de Cuba (engineering society) headquartered in city.
 1908
 Partido Independiente de Color (political party) founded in Havana.
 Bohemia magazine begins publication.
 Hotel Sevilla built.
 1909 – Lonja del Comercio building (stock exchange) and  constructed.
 1910 – Pimp Alberto Yarini is killed in the San Isidro barrio of Old Havana.
 1913
 National Museum of Fine Arts of Havana founded.
 El Heraldo de Cuba newspaper begins publication.
 1917
 Manzana de Gómez shopping arcade built.
 Club Atenas organized.
 1919
 Florida West Indies Airways begins flights to/from Key West, USA.
 Population: 363,506 city; 697,583 province.

 1920
 Museum of the Revolution (Presidential Palace before 1959) built.
 Biblioteca Municipal (library) and Ruston Academy established.
 1923 –  built.
 1925 Colegio de Belen, designed by Leonardo Morales y Pedroso is built.
 1927 – Regina Theatre and Centro Asturiano open.
 1928
 January–February: Pan-American Conference held in Havana.
 Parque de la Fraternidad Americana (park) and Teatro Auditorium inaugurated.
 1929 – National Capitol Building constructed.
 1930
 Hotel Nacional de Cuba opens.
 Rancho Boyeros Airport begins operating.
 Bacardi Building constructed.
 1934 – Orquesta de Cámara de La Habana (musical group) formed.
 1938 –  created;  becomes city historian.
 1939
 Tropicana Club in business.
 Cuban Baseball Hall of Fame inaugurated.
 Lyceum and Lawn Tennis Club formed.
 1945 – International Air Transport Association founded in Havana.
 1946
 Havana Conference held.
 Manuel Fernandez Supervielle becomes mayor.
 1947
Radiocentro CMQ Building
 1948 – Cuban National Ballet founded.

1950s–1990s
 1952 - 1952 Cuban coup d'état
 1953 – Iglesia de Jesús de Miramar (church) and Embassy of the United States built.
 1954 - Cuban general election
 1956 – FOCSA Building.
 1957
 13 March: Presidential Palace Attack.
  building constructed on Plaza Cívica.
 Coliseo de la Ciudad Deportiva (arena) opens.
 1958
 November: Rafael Guas Inclán elected mayor.
 José Martí Memorial erected in Plaza Cívica.
 1958 Cuban general election
 Andrés Rivero Agüero is the last democratically elected president of Cuba under the 1940 Constitution.
 1959
 January: Revolutionary forces take city.
 Instituto Nacional de Ahorro y Vivienda (housing agency) headquartered in Havana.
 Plaza del Vapor demolished by the Castro government.
 Plaza Cívica renamed "Plaza de la Revolución".
 1960 – International Ballet Festival of Havana begins.
 1961
 Cuban Ministry of the Interior headquartered in Havana.
 Instituto Tecnico Militar established.
 1962 – Cuban National Ballet School established.
 1963 – Cuban Journalists Union headquartered in Havana.
 1964
 Jaime Lucas Ortega y Alamino becomes Catholic archbishop of Havana.
 Population: 940,700 city; 1,517,700 urban agglomeration.
 1965
  in use as headquarters of the Communist Party.
 International School of Havana established.
 1968 –  (garden) established.
 1970 - Population: 1,008,500 city; 1,751,216 urban agglomeration.
 1971 – Danza Contemporanea de Cuba active.
 1975 – December: 1st Congress of the Communist Party of Cuba held in Havana.
 1976 – Arroyo Naranjo, Boyeros, Centro Habana, Cerro, Cotorro, Diez de Octubre, Guanabacoa, La Habana del Este, La Habana Vieja, La Lisa, Marianao, Playa, Plaza de la Revolución, Regla, San Miguel del Padrón administrative municipalities created.
 1977 – Ministerio de Cultura de la República de Cuba's Editorial Letras Cubanas publishing house headquartered in Havana.
 1978 – City hosts World Festival of Youth and Students.
 1979
 Havana Film Festival begins.
  built.
 1982
 Old Havana designated an UNESCO World Heritage Site.
 Havana International Book Fair begins.
 1983 –  headquartered in Havana.
 1984 – Havana Biennial Art Exhibition begins.
 1987
 Grupo para el Desarrollo Integral de la Capital (urban planning group) formed.
 Russian embassy built.
 Instituto de Historia de Cuba headquartered in Havana.
 1991
 Estadio Panamericano (stadium) opens.
 1991 Pan American Games held in Havana.
 1993 - Population: 2,175,888 city (estimate).
 1994
 August 1994 protest in Cuba.
 Bán Rarra group active.
 Meliá Cohiba Hotel in business.
 1998 – January: Catholic Pope visits Havana.
 1999 – Population: 2,189,716 city; 2,891,500 province.

21st century
 2001 – Ballet Rakatan founded.
 2003
 Damas de Blanco protest begins.
 Juan Contino Aslán becomes mayor.
 2005 – December: World Trade Union Congress held in city.
 2011
 April: 6th Congress of the Communist Party of Cuba held in Havana.
 Marta Hernández Romero becomes mayor.
 2012 – Population: 2,105,291.
 2014
 Fábrica de Arte Cubano cultural space established.
 Population: 2,121,871.
 2015
 January: United States–Cuban talks held in Havana.
 September: Catholic pope visits city.
 2016
 March: U.S. president Obama visits Havana.
 April 7: Congress of the Communist Party of Cuba held in Havana.
 2019
 An EF4 tornado seriously damage the city and kills at least three.
 Havana's celebrates its 500th Anniversary of founding.
 2022 - Hotel Saratoga explosion

See also
 History of Havana
 Timeline of Cuban history
 Timelines of other cities in Cuba: Camagüey, Cienfuegos, Guantánamo, Holguín, Matanzas, Santiago de Cuba

References

This article incorporates information from the Spanish Wikipedia.

Bibliography

Published in the 18th–19th century
in English
 
 
 
 
 
 
 
 

in Spanish
 
 
  (chronology)

Published in the 20th century
in English
 
  (Annotated list of titles published in Havana, arranged chronologically)
 
 
 
 
 
 
 
 
 
  (Includes profile of Havana)
 
 
 

in Spanish
  + Directoria de las calles de la Habana (etc.)

Published in the 21st century
in English
 
 
 
 
 
 
 
 
 
 
 
 
 
 
 

in Spanish
  (chronology)

External links

 
 
 , ca. 1849–2005
 Items related to Havana, various dates (via Digital Public Library of America)
 Items related to Havana, various dates (via Europeana)
 Images of Havana, various dates (via New York Public Library)
  (includes articles about Havana)

Havana

Havana
Havana